Lindsay Davenport was the defending champion, but did not compete this year.

Martina Hingis won the title, defeating Monica Seles in the final 7–6(8–6), 4–6, 6–3.

Seeds
The first four seeds received a bye into the second round.

Draw

Finals

Top half

Bottom half

References
 Main and Qualifying Draws

Toray Pan Pacific Open - Singles
2002 Toray Pan Pacific Open